Rachel Flowers (born December 21, 1993) is an American multi-instrumentalist and composer.

Career 
Flowers was born 15 weeks prematurely, which resulted in her becoming permanently blind a few weeks after her birth.

Flowers took second place in the student jazz contest at the Ventura Music Festival in Ventura, California, in 2010, and won it the following year.

She has performed with Dweezil Zappa, Arturo Sandoval, Taylor Eigsti, Jeff "Skunk" Baxter, Marc Bonilla, Jordan Rudess, Steve Porcaro, Rick Wakeman, Burt Bacharach, and Bob Reynolds. 

A documentary film about her, Hearing Is Believing, was released in 2017.

Discography
2016 – Listen
2017 – Hearing Is Believing (Music from the Soundtrack)
2018 – Going Somewhere
2021 – Bigger on the Inside

References

External Links
 

American multi-instrumentalists
Blind musicians
1993 births
Living people
American women composers
Musicians from Ventura County, California
21st-century American composers
21st-century American women musicians
21st-century women composers